The Anahuac Mayab University (Spanish: Universidad Anáhuac Mayab) is a private institution of higher education in Mérida, Yucatán, México and belongs to the religious congregation of the Legion of Christ.

It was founded in 1984 through an initiative of Archbishop Manuel Castro Ruiz with the support of a group of businessmen from southern Mexico. The University began with degrees in Business Administration, Tourism Business Administration, Accounting, and Law.

At present, 22 bachelor degrees are offered, plus masters and doctoral degrees.

Anahuac Mayab joined the international Anahuac University Network in 2004, made up of 9 universities in Mexico and 6 abroad. In the year 2006 it becomes the first educational institution in the national scope to obtain 100% accreditation of its educational programs, through the organizations belonging to COPAES (Council for Accreditation of Higher Education).

See also
 Education in Mexico
 Anahuac Universities Network

References

External links
 Official website

1984 establishments in Mexico
Educational institutions established in 1984
Universities and colleges in Yucatán
Regnum Christi
Legion of Christ
Anahuac universities

indian th eb ib  box bxo#